Miguel Angel Latín Carrasco (born July 27, 1968 in Llay-Llay, Chile) is a former Chilean footballer who played for clubs of Chile.

Teams
  Santiago Wanderers 1988-1990
  Unión Española 1991
  Deportes Temuco 1992-1996
  Colo-Colo 1997
  Deportes Temuco 1998
  Deportes La Serena 1999

Honours
Colo-Colo
 Primera División de Chile (1): 1997

References
 Profile at BDFA 

1968 births
Living people
Chilean footballers
Chile under-20 international footballers
Colo-Colo footballers
Unión Española footballers
Deportes Temuco footballers
Santiago Wanderers footballers
Chilean Primera División players
Primera B de Chile players
Association football defenders